Love on a Saturday Night is a London Weekend Television produced game show that aired on ITV between 7 February and 22 May 2004. It was a replacement show for Blind Date, and lasted only two series before being axed.

The first episode, which was broadcast live, was watched by 5.1 million viewers. An episode in the second series was watched by 3.8 million viewers.

Format

The main game
The main round would be based in the middle of the studio where either three men or three women (it would alternate each week) would be wearing different coloured masks and known as Mr Red/Miss Ruby, Mr Blue/Miss Sapphire, Mr Green/Miss Emerald (this was the blind date bit), then the person asking the questions would be standing to one side of them with Davina.

Celebrity dating
Other features included celebrity dates. This was a chance for a member of the audience to be surprised and go on a date with a celebrity. Some of the celebrities included were: Jodie Marsh, Sam Nixon, Mark Owen, Shobna Gulati, Sally Lindsay, Richard Blackwood, Tony Blackburn, Ronan Keating, Terri Dwyer, Nicki Chapman and the members of British five-piece boy band V.

Trivia
Jonathan Wilkes' outside broadcasts were only featured in Series 1 as a member of the public uttered a profanity live on air when surprised by Wilkes and his camera crew, before the 9 o'clock watershed. Thereafter, the programme was also taped as opposed to being broadcast live.

All episodes originated from The London Studios.

Transmissions

References

External links 

ITV game shows
2004 British television series debuts
2004 British television series endings
Television series by ITV Studios
London Weekend Television shows
2000s British game shows